Sir Tom Talbot Leyland Scarisbrick, 1st Baronet (28 April 1874 – 18 May 1933) was a British Liberal Party politician.

He was Liberal Member of Parliament for South Dorset from 1906 to 1910, mayor of Southport 1902–1903, and JP Lancashire 1st Baronet of Greaves Hall.

Sir Talbot Scarisbrick was the elder son of Sir Charles Scarisbrick [Kt 1903; JP; late Mayor of Southport; born 20 April 1839 died 15 January 1923; m 1860, Bertha Petronella (d 1915), d of Ernst Marquard Schonfeld, of Hanau-on-Main and Düsseldorf; one s two d. Address: Scarisbrick Lodge, Southport, Lancs.]; m 1895, Josephine, daughter of W. S. Chamberlain of Cleveland, Ohio; Succeeded by his son, Everard Talbot Scarisbrick [b 10 Dec. 1896; died 29 August 1955; m 1919, Nadine, d of Charles Brumm, Manchester]. Address: Scarisbrick Hall, Lancashire. Motor Car Registration Number: LO 8321, LL 6374, LP 5397.

Arms

References

External links
 

1874 births
1933 deaths
Liberal Party (UK) MPs for English constituencies
Baronets in the Baronetage of the United Kingdom
UK MPs 1906–1910
Mayors of places in Merseyside